Belfont Plantation House is a historic plantation house located near Latham, Beaufort County, North Carolina.  It dates to the 18th century, and is a two-story, Georgian style frame dwelling.  It features a pair of double-shouldered exterior end chimneys joined by a two-story brick pent.

It was listed on the National Register of Historic Places in 1976.

References

Plantation houses in North Carolina
Houses on the National Register of Historic Places in North Carolina
Georgian architecture in North Carolina
Houses in Beaufort County, North Carolina
National Register of Historic Places in Beaufort County, North Carolina